Amsole High School is a higher secondary school established in 1969 and situated at a village under Karkach gram panchayat of Gazole block of Malda district, West Bengal.

References

External links
 Facebook page

High schools and secondary schools in West Bengal
Schools in Malda district
Educational institutions established in 1969
1969 establishments in West Bengal